Major-General the Hon. John Edward Lindley  (15 September 1860 – 7 April 1925) was a British Army officer.

Military career
Born the son of Nathaniel Lindley, Baron Lindley and Sarah Katherine Teale, Lindley was commissioned into the South Staffordshire Regiment but transferred to the 1st The Royal Dragoons on 19 November 1881. After serving in the Second Boer War, he became Adjutant-General at Northern Command in 1903, Commandant of the Cavalry School in 1905 and commander of the 3rd Cavalry Brigade in 1907. He went on to become General Officer Commanding the Welsh Division in October 1914. He landed with his division at Suvla Bay on 6 August 1915 during the Gallipoli campaign of the First World War, in which action his division suffered significant losses: he voluntarily handed over his command, saying that he had "lost control", on 16 August 1915.

References

1860 births
1925 deaths
British Army generals of World War I
South Staffordshire Regiment officers
1st The Royal Dragoons officers
Sons of life peers
British Army major generals
British Army personnel of the Second Boer War